Walayar River (also called Velliyar River or Valliyar River) is one of the tributaries of the river Kalpathipuzha. Kalpathipuzha is one of the main  tributaries of the  Bharathapuzha River, the second-longest river in Kerala, India. The Walayar Dam is constructed across this river. It was completed and opened in 1964. The river is by a valley and a garden equipped with a children's play area. Previously Walayar Dam was as famous as Malampuzha Dam.

See also 
Bharathapuzha - Main river
Kalpathipuzha - One of the main tributaries of the river Bharathapuzha

Other tributaries of the river Kalpathipuzha
 Korayar
 Varattar
 Malampuzha

Rivers of Palakkad district
Bharathappuzha